This article contains an overview of the year 1993 in athletics.

International events

 African Championships
 Asian Championships
 Bolivarian Games
 Central American and Caribbean Games
 Central American Championships
 East Asian Games
 Maccabiah Games
 Mediterranean Games
 Chinese National Games
 South American Championships
 South Asian Games
 Southeast Asian Games
 World Championships
 World Cross Country Championships
 World Half Marathon Championships
 World Indoor Championships
 World Race Walking Cup
 World Student Games

World records

Men

The relay team of the United States in the men's 4x100m, formed by Jon Drummond, Andre Cason, Dennis Mitchell and Leroy Burrell, equal its own world record, set the previous year at the 1992 Summer Olympics, clocking 37.40 on 1993-08-21 at the World Championships in Stuttgart, Germany. The first mark was set by Michael Marsh, Leroy Burrell, Dennis Mitchell and Carl Lewis on 1992-08-08.

Women

Sun's PV of 4.11m was not officially recognised as a record as there were only 2 competitors (regulations require a minimum of 3)

Awards

Men

Women

Men's Best Year Performers

100 metres
Main race this year: World Championships 100 metres

200 metres
Main race this year: World Championships 200 metres

400 metres
Main race this year: World Championships 400 metres

800 metres
Main race this year: World Championships 800 metres

1,500 metres
Main race this year: World Championships 1,500 metres

Mile

3,000 metres

5,000 metres
Main race this year: World Championships 5,000 metres

10,000 metres
Main race this year: World Championships 10,000 metres

Half Marathon

Marathon
Main race this year: World Championships Marathon

110m Hurdles
Main race this year: World Championships 110m Hurdles

400m Hurdles
Main race this year: World Championships 400m Hurdles

3,000m Steeplechase
Main race this year: World Championships 3,000m Steeplechase

High Jump
Main competition this year: World Championships High Jump

Long Jump
Main competition this year: World Championships Long Jump

Triple Jump
Main competition this year: World Championships Triple Jump

Discus
Main competition this year: World Championships Discus Throw

Shot Put
Main competition this year: World Championships Shot Put

Hammer
Main competition this year: World Championships Hammer Throw

Javelin (new design)
Main competition this year: World Championships Javelin Throw

Pole Vault
Main competition this year: World Championships Pole Vault

Decathlon
Main competition this year: World Championships Decathlon

Women's Best Year Performers

60 meters

100 metres
Main race this year: World Championships 100 metres

200 metres
Main race this year: World Championships 200 metres

400 metres
Main race this year: World Championships 400 metres

800 metres
Main race this year: World Championships 800 metres

1,500 metres
Main race this year: World Championships 1,500 metres

Mile

3,000 metres
Main race this year: World Championships 3,000 metres

5,000 metres

10,000 metres
Main race this year: World Championships 10,000 metres

Half Marathon

Marathon
Main race this year: World Championships Marathon

60 m hurdles

100m Hurdles
Main race this year: World Championships 100m Hurdles

400m Hurdles
Main race this year: World Championships 400m Hurdles

High Jump
Main competition this year: World Championships High Jump

Long Jump
Main competition this year: World Championships Long Jump

Triple Jump
Main competition this year: World Championships Triple Jump

Discus
Main competition this year: World Championships Discus Throw

Shot Put
Main competition this year: World Championships Shot Put

Hammer

Javelin (old design)
Main competition this year: World Championships Javelin Throw

Heptathlon
Main competition this year: World Championships Heptathlon

Births
March 7 
Roman Danyliuk, Ukrainian athlete
Alysbeth Félix, Puerto Rican athlete

Deaths
January 24 — Detlef Gerstenberg (35), East German hammer thrower (b. 1957)
November 9 — Anne Smith (52), British middle distance runner (b. 1941)

References
 Year Lists
 1993 Year Rankings
 Association of Road Racing Statisticians

 
Athletics (track and field) by year